Kadysi (Keźese) is a rural locality (a village) in Novoberdyashsky Selsoviet, Karaidelsky District, Bashkortostan, Russia. The population was 36 as of 2010. There is 1 street.

Geography 
Kadysi is located 48 km southeast of Karaidel (the district's administrative centre) by road. Dyurtyuli is the nearest rural locality.

References 

Rural localities in Karaidelsky District